The Palermo metropolitan railway service is a commuter rail system operated by Trenitalia. It serves the city of Palermo in Sicily, Italy.

Lines 

There are two lines:
 Palermo CentralePunta Raisi (airport)
 Palermo NotarbartoloGiachery

Both lines are served by a train every 30 minutes, although on the Palermo CentralePunta Raisi line some stops are served by half of the trains.

History 
The first section of the Palermo "metropolitana" was opened in 1990, a month before the beginning of Italia 90, the football World Cup. The line had only six stations: Palermo Centrale, Vespri, Palermo Notarbartolo, Federico, Fiera and Giachery. The line used the tracks of the old PalermoTrapani railway, running across the city until Notarbartolo station, and from there it followed the branch to the port, along which new stops were built.

This line was also used to reach the Stadio Renzo Barbera (Stadio della Favorita) football stadium.

In November 1993 a new branch was opened, on the tracks of the railway to Trapani, running diesel railcars type ALn 668. The first two stops were San Lorenzo-Colli and Tommaso Natale. In 1994 stops at Francia and Cardillo-Zen were opened.

In 2001 a new tunnel station (Palazzo Reale-Orleans) was opened, serving the city centre. The metropolitan service was extended to Punta Raisi railway station, serving the Falcone Borsellino Airport.

Projects

Palermo CentralePunta Raisi 

Improvements on this line began 22 February 2008.
 A second track is planned for the Palermo-Trapani route, which currently is only a single track between the Orleans and Carini stations. With the new track in place, there will be an increase in the number of trains and a reduction in journey times.
 The work includes removing all level crossings by lowering the track in some sections of the line and the construction of overpasses at other sections, constructing whichever is best at that location.
 Twelve stops will be added with new stations at Ficarazzi, Roccella, Guadagna, Palazzo di Giustizia, Lolli, Lazio-Restivo, Belgio, La Malfa, Sferracavallo, Kennedy, Torre Ciachea and Orsa.
 The line will also be extended to Ficarazzi, with connections through to Messina.

Palermo NotarbartoloGiachery 
This route was repaired in 1993.
 The line will be completely transformed, forming a complete ring known as the Palermo Rail Ring, extending from Giachery to Notarbartolo with new stops at Porto and Malaspina Politeama-Catania.
 The new route will be underground.
 A new stop will open Lazio Libertà.
 This line will not get a second track.
 Work has stopped temporarily due to an appeal made by the firm that came in second when the contract was awarded.

See also 
 Palermo Centrale railway station
 List of rapid transit systems

References

External links 

 Palermo metropolitan railways unofficial website
 News about the works (IT)

Transport in Palermo
Rapid transit in Italy